{{DISPLAYTITLE:NZR JA class}}

The NZR JA class were a type of 4-8-2 steam locomotive used on the New Zealand railway network. The class was built in two batches, the first batch was built at Dunedin's Hillside Workshops between 1946 and 1956 and the second batch by the North British Locomotive Works in 1951. To distinguish between the batches, locomotives are identified by their maker.

The JA class was the last class of steam locomotive built both for and by New Zealand Railways (NZR). Hillside built JA 1274 was the last steam locomotive ever built by NZR, and the North British JAs were the last steam locomotives built overseas for the NZR.

The class had relatively short lives of between 12 and 24 years, as they were replaced by diesel locomotives as part of NZR's dieselisation process. Nine JAs lasted until the end of steam on 26 October 1971.

Hillside JA of 1946

History
The class were an improved version of the J class locomotives. Unlike the J class, which were built overseas by the North British Locomotive Company in Glasgow, Scotland, the new class were instead constructed by NZR's Hillside Workshops in Dunedin. Much of the components, such as the bar frames, were still sourced from North British as Hillside lacked the means to construct such a frame.

Some of the more notable improvements from the J class were the use of the Westinghouse cross-compound pump; Ashton double pressure gauge; the Sellars injector in the cab; steam for the pump was taken from a manifold in the cab and not an outlet on the steam dome; combined gauges in the cab; and roller bearings on the driving and connecting rods. However, the first two JAs produced, No.'s 1242 and 1243, did not have roller bearings on any of the rods, and on the rest of the locomotives numbered in the 124X range, roller bearings were only present at the connection between the driving and connecting rods and not on the other wheels. All roller-bearing equipped JA locomotives 1265 to 1270 were assigned by Linwood locomotive depot in Christchurch and used to haul the South Island Limited wherever possible between 1952 and 1968, the fastest being JA 1270 scrapped in mid-1969, requiring only minimal repair after running into an unaligned turntable pit. In most other respects the class was virtually identical to the earlier J class, although the JA class was never fitted with bullet-nose streamlining.

Although the first JA class member was built in 1946, the boilers for the last ten Hillside JA plus two spare boilers were not delivered from North British until 1953. For this and a number of other factors, the last member of the class was not turned out of the workshops until December 1956. That last locomotive, JA 1274, was both the last steam locomotive built for and by NZR.

The class was intended for the far more extensive fast passenger trains that existed in the South Island before the introduction of 88-seater railcars in 1956, and the decline in long-distance rail passenger services.

In service
The class only ever worked in the South Island during their NZR career. The first members operated out of Dunedin, although they were supposed to be allocated to Christchurch. When enough of the class were in service to displace the 10 members of the J class based out of Dunedin, the J locomotives headed north to join the rest of their class in the North Island.

The JAs were primarily express and express freight engines running from Invercargill to Christchurch but extended their duties during their brief prime on the South Island Main Trunk from Bluff to Parnassus in the north, and on the Midland Line as far west as Arthur's Pass. Before the full delivery of the JA class, English Electric diesel locomotives had already taken over the main freight services and summer expresses on the Dunedin-Oamaru section. The JA was too big for long branch lines like Otago Central Railway or Kingston Branch. Despite some restrictions, the class were the mainstay of the South Island network.

The JAs excelled when hauling the South Island Limited passenger train between Invercargill and Christchurch, notably on the fairly flat, Invercargill-Dunedin section and particularly on the fast run across the Canterbury Plains between Christchurch and Oamaru, and the evening run back on train 144 to Christchurch was well known on occasions when the train was late and racing to get to the Lyttelton-Wellington Ferry prior to its sailing. The official passenger train speed limit in New Zealand in this era was 50 mph (80.5 km/h), but the class were known to operate at higher speeds, particularly across the Canterbury Plains, where they were officially allowed to run at 55 mph (88.5 km/h).

Rail writer David Leitch believed JA drivers' accounts of  running as accurate. Additional support comes from an official source, the 1966 Encyclopaedia of New Zealand, which states "The speedy and graceful "JA" has demonstrated its remarkable performance in express service on the level plains of Canterbury, and on occasions has attained speeds in excess of 70 miles an hour."

Withdrawal and disposal
The first of the class, JA 1249 and 1272 were not withdrawn until March 1968, in distinct contrast to the types J, JB and North British JA cousins. In 1966, 12 JA class members (and four J class) received a full overhaul, six in 1967 and two in 1968. Use of steam on freight trains on the East Coast of the South Island finished in March 1969, and 15 JAs and the three Js rebuilt with North Island JA tenders and trailing engine bogies were maintained for service. JA 1267 was the last steam engine given a full overhaul by NZR in November 1968. It appears this last full overhaul involved extensive use of parts from JA 1268 and included fitting a different boiler, (both the last two New Zealand and Southland JA 1273 and 1274 had their low mileage boilers transferred to other JA in 1967-68, and ran to 1971 with older JA boilers, (1274 being in static preservation at Dunedin station in 1975) and with the last three Js provided one of the last high-speed steam-hauled passenger services in the world, between Christchurch and Oamaru. The JA class lasted in front-line duty until the end of steam in New Zealand; the South Island Limited was then worked by steam locomotives until replaced by the diesel-hauled Southerner in November 1970. It was also planned to dieselise the overnight Friday and Sunday express with surplus steam heat vans when the North Island Limited was replaced by the Silver Star, but late delivery of the new train from Japan meant the services were steam-hauled for another year until 26 October 1971. The locomotives remained ready for service into November but were never called upon.

Due to locomotives suffering mechanical defects or in need of repairs, they were often sidelined. Some, such as JA 1271, were used as stationary boilers. These locomotives, as was common practice at the time, were often stripped of parts to keep the rest of the fleet going.

North British JA of 1951

History
In 1950 it became clear additional motive power was required in the North Island, but the process of dieselisation was yet to begin. Consequently, NZR chose to order 16 steam locomotives from North British to the design of the successful J class of 1939. These locomotives contained a number of differences to both the J class and Hillside JA class locomotives. Although they were turned out with the cross-compound pump, roller bearings on the rods were limited to the connection between the connecting and driving rod, mechanical lubrication was employed. 

In January 1951 the order had been made for the 16 JA to be coal burners, and North British regarded the order as essentially a repeat order, virtually identical to 1939 J class locomotives. In April 1951 the NZR Chief Mechanical Engineer requested the order to be changed to oil burning due to perceived long term coal shortage due to the 1951 New Zealand waterfront dispute, the associated strike by miners, unavailability of shipping for coal and the expected long term high imported coal price and the long time it would take to build up coal stocks to safe levels, and the class were built as oil burners, with no grate, ash pan or fire door (the only class of locomotives on the NZR to be built completely as oil burners) and ACFL blow down was incorporated late in their construction. 

A significant improvement was the incorporation of French TIA, blow down equipment which enabled rapid ejection of boiler sludge and reduced the boiler scale, enabling much faster turnaround and higher availability. The system of injection of the oil flow into the burners is different and far more effective than in NZR 1948–1950 conversion of 12 J class locomotives to oil burning. Other detail differences were the use of Stone's headlights and electrical generator instead of the usual Pyle National equipment, the "Butterfly" number boards on the front headlight, and the lack of smokebox number plate (although a smokebox plate was specified by the NZR).

In service
Captive to the North Island, the North British JAs operated on the routes most commonly worked by oil-burning locomotives. "The North British JAs were fine clean-lined machines, and extremely popular in the Auckland district where they were put to use on most tasks. They handled almost every express train in that area for a dozen years," The Auckland JA were very much specialized express engines and far more impressive express performers than the KA in the view of most Auckland engine drivers.

However, the rest of the steam fleet, other than the J and JB, suffered increased mechanical failure and repair costs, in moving the heavier post-war traffic on the NIMT. By 1955 the K and X 4-8-2 classes were worn out, but 9 K class were rebuilt with KA frames in 1955–57 as it unacceptable to write off the K class locomotives, and retain useful Baldwin Aa. However, the superiority of the DA class diesel and JA meant it was announced, an "A grade" overhaul of a K class locomotive in 1961 was the last for the class.

An analysis in 1959 found that the North British JA matched the availability of the new DA class, each JA being available 252 days a year in the North Island. Cost per mile for the JA was much higher, with the steam locomotive achieving 82% of the DA mileage. The first eleven, JAs 1275–1285, were based in Auckland while the other five, JAs 1286–1290, were based initially at Palmerston North before being moved to Napier in 1963.

The Auckland-based locomotives were regularly allocated to the North Auckland Line the Opua Express until 1959 and the Helensville local until 1966 and the North Island Main Trunk services such as Auckland–Wellington, 227/626 Express Mail train and faster Night Limited and Auckland–Wellington express goods train 627. There are however accounts of them being used elsewhere, with accounts surviving of JA 1279 running on the Waiuku Branch in the early 1960s, and later on the Raetihi Branch during the same decade after coal-fired AB 700 caused several lineside fires. When working with other 4-8-2s on the NAL, they were required to have a bogie wagon such as a UB flat wagon between the two engines in order to distribute weight more evenly on the light bridges along that line.

The five Palmerston North-based engines, by contrast, were less frequently allocated to NIMT trains, instead of running over the Marton - New Plymouth Line to Wanganui and the Palmerston North - Gisborne Line as far as Gisborne. By comparison, the Palmerston North-based JAs spent more time working freight trains, particularly with the arrival of the 88 seater railcars.

Following the start of dieselisation in the 1960s, the locomotives migrated to Frankton Junction. While JA 1286 was briefly transferred to Auckland in the mid-1960s, it was felt it did not perform as well as the eleven Auckland-based locomotives and was quickly re-allocated to Frankton. After this, the locomotives were largely relegated to the old East Coast Main Trunk Railway between Hamilton, Tauranga and Taneatua, again largely on freight trains due to the reduction of passenger services from Taneatua to Te Puke, which was by now handled by the 88 seater railcars.

Withdrawal and disposal
Despite being a very young class, some of the North British JA class members were among the first of the J types to be withdrawn. The first of the class to be withdrawn, JA 1279, was withdrawn in 1964 and sent to Hillside Workshops minus at least one driving wheelset, taken to repair JA 1275 after it suffered an axle fracture while passing through Mercer that year. The rest of the locomotive then became a source of spares for the J and Hillside JA class locomotives in the South Island, with the oil-fired boiler being converted to coal-firing before being fitted to Greymouth-based J 1212 during a C grade overhaul.

As the North British JAs were withdrawn, most were stripped of parts to keep the South Island J and JA class locomotives running, along with the remaining North British JAs which by then were based out of Frankton Junction. Several of the tenders from JA 1287, 1288, 1290 locomotives, transferred south in November 1966, which were in relatively good condition, were rebuilt to accommodate a coal bunker in place of the fuel oil tank and attached to J class locomotives whose original 1939-built tenders were life-expired. Other parts of the surplus North Island JA were also refitted, including the trailing trucks and approval was given to fit JA 1288 boiler. Most of the North Island JA were withdrawn too late in 1967 or early 1968, to be reprocessed, as A-grade South Island J overhauls had ceased with dieselisation, but JA 1281 boiler was refitted to J 1236 in an A-grade Hillside overhaul in 1967, with the firebox converted from oil to coal burning, but with all the oil firing fittings left in place, making easier, J1236 restoration and reconversion to oil burning in 1991-2001 for rail excursions, the boiler of JA 1278 withdrawn in March 1968 and installed that year in a C-grade overhaul of JA 1252 in Dunedin. 

Only three of the North British JA class managed to reach the end of North Island steam in 1968, JA 1275 being one of them. After withdrawal and removal of all useful parts, the North British JAs were onsold to Sims Pacific Metal Industries and towed as required to Sims Otahuhu scrapyard, adjacent to the Otahuhu Workshops, for scrapping. The only locomotive to avoid this fate, JA 1275, was purchased by Les Hostick in 1968 and transported to the NZR&LS Waikato Branch's Te Awamutu Railway Museum along with BB 144 for static display.

Preservation

Six of the Hillside JAs survived to be preserved; by contrast only one North British JA remains. Additionally, two preserved J class locomotives have North British JA tenders.

Hillside JAs

 JA 1240 "Jessica" was preserved by Blenheim man Peter Coleman, and was stored serviceable at his Blenheim property. In 1988 after his death, JA 1240 was purchased by Ian Welch, and in 1990 travelled to the Mainline Steam Heritage Trust's Parnell depot. This locomotive's restoration for mainline use (as a coal burner) has been completed, and is based in Christchurch. It has been named after one of owner Ian Welch's granddaughters.

 JA 1250 "Diana" was preserved by the Railway Enthusiasts Society for use on their Steam Safari train in 1972. After this series of excursions, it was purchased by Phil Goldman, who named the engine after his wife, Diana. JA 1250 was restored by the Glenbrook Vintage Railway for use on their railway. It was also used for scenes in the 1983 feature film Merry Christmas, Mr. Lawrence. In 1985, JA 1250 was one of two engines selected to be used on the first mainline steam-hauled trip since the end of steam. After this JA 1250 ventured around the country, being a notable attendee of the 1988 Rail 125 celebrations. Between 1994 and 1998 JA 1250 underwent a substantial overhaul and returned to mainline and GVR service. From 2006 JA 1250's mainline certification lapsed, and it was confined to the Glenbrook Vintage Railway. In 2011 it was re-certified for mainline running again and made its debut back on the main line in spectacular fashion with a doubleheader from Glenbrook to Hamilton with JA 1271. After a further two years of mainline running Diana retired to the GVR for the remainder of her boiler ticket, on Auckland Anniversary Weekend in 2017 a Farewell Weekend was held for the engine and she operated for a further 4 months before her last day in service on 30 April 2017. The locomotive is now under an overhaul.

JA 1260 was preserved by the Ashburton Railway and Preservation Society in May 1972. It saw limited use on the Plains Railway's line before a year's lease to the Weka Pass Railway in 1986. After its return to Plains, it was dismantled for an overhaul which was protracted due to other pressing projects. In 2007 work on this locomotive began at a fast pace, and in May 2008 JA 1260 was back in service on the railway. Notably, JA 1260 is the only preserved member of the class to be operating at a lower boiler pressure of 180psi instead of 200psi – this reduction was made due to the limited nature of operations at The Plains Vintage Railway & Historical Museum.

 JA 1267 was preserved by a syndicate and stored at the Te Awamutu Railway Museum at Te Awamutu, 1972. It sat on static display under a rudimentary shelter until 2008 when due to the winding up of the museum and discord amongst the syndicate, the locomotive was placed up for auction. It was purchased by Ian Welch and transferred to the Mainline Steam Heritage Trust's Parnell depot where it is stored pending eventual overhaul to mainline running.

 JA 1271 was preserved by Reid McNaught and Russell Gibbard in 1978. At the time of purchase JA 1271 was incomplete and in a sorry state, having been used as a stationary boiler plant since 1970 after a motion failure. It was transferred to Steam Incorporated's Paekakariki base and comprehensively restored to mainline running. Its debut in 1997 kicked off with a tour of the South Island, before returning north where it has become a very active mainline locomotive. It hauled the 2003 50th Anniversary Commemoration train of the Tangiwai disaster, and also was used prominently in the 100th Anniversary of the Parliamentary Special.

 JA 1274 was preserved by the New Zealand Railway and Locomotive Society Otago branch in 1971, and in 1974 was placed on display in a specially erected shelter at the Otago Settlers Museum. It has remained on display there until 2011 when a new shelter was built for its display closer to the station building. There are no plans for restoration to working order for this locomotive.

North British JAs

 JA 1275 "Julie Anne" was preserved by Les Hostick in 1967 and stored at the Te Awamutu Railway Museum at Te Awamutu, 1972. It sat on static display under a rudimentary shelter until 1994 when it was leased to Ian Welch and transferred to the Mainline Steam Heritage Trust's Parnell depot for restoration to mainline running condition. Work began in 2001, and in 2004 JA 1275 returned to the mainline.

References

Citations

Bibliography

External links
 NZR Steam locomotives – JA class
 Railway Enthusiasts Society
 Owners and Operators of JA 1271
 Plains Railway – home of JA 1260
 Mainline Steam – JA 1275, JA 1240 and JA 1267

Ja class
4-8-2 locomotives
NBL locomotives
3 ft 6 in gauge locomotives of New Zealand
Railway locomotives introduced in 1947